Peje Bongre is a chiefdom in Sierra Leone. It is located in Kailahun District, Eastern Province.

References

Chiefdoms of Sierra Leone